Mixmash Records is a record label founded by DJ and producer Laidback Luke. The label primarily distributes house music, with subgenres including  electro house, future house and progressive house. Mixmash Records is known to provide young talents a platform and is considered by many to be one of the most important labels in terms of new sounds and genre developments. Some artists that have worked and published on Mixmash Records include Avicii, Afrojack, Steve Angello, Blasterjaxx, D.O.D, Inpetto,  Keanu Silva, Mark Villa, A-Trak and Steve Aoki.

History 
Founded in 2004, the label was originally meant to be an outlet for Laidback Luke's productions. Later, it became an imprint where some upcoming talents released their first tracks. The label also has two sub-labels; Mixmash Deep and Ones To Watch Records. Whilst Mixmash Deep focuses on deep house and future house tracks, Ones To Watch is more trap, Jersey House and Dirty Dutch oriented.

References

External links 

Record labels established in 2004
Dutch record labels